UFC All Access is a reality television show which aired on Spike TV.  Hosted by Rachelle Leah, UFC All Access went behind the scenes into the lives of Mixed Martial Arts fighters in the Ultimate Fighting Championship as they trained for their upcoming bouts.  It usually aired during the week of a major UFC pay-per-view event. Spike TV stopped production on the series.

Featured fighters
2006-02-23: Rich Franklin
2006-04-10: Andrei Arlovski
2006-07-03: Tito Ortiz
2006-08-21: Renato Sobral
2006-11-13: Matt Hughes
2006-12-28: Chuck Liddell
2007-04-04: Georges St-Pierre
2007-05-21: Quinton Jackson
2007-07-02: Sean Sherk
2007-08-23: Randy Couture
2007-09-20: Forrest Griffin
2007-12-27: Wanderlei Silva
2008-01-31: Brock Lesnar
2008-10-24: Anderson Silva

References

External links
 

Spike (TV network) original programming
American sports television series
Ultimate Fighting Championship television series
2005 American television series debuts
2000s American reality television series
2010s American reality television series